Vincent Wong born Vivian Warren Chen (4 February 1928 – 13 March 2015) was a British-Chinese actor who had a long career (over 50 years) in television and films. He acted in four James Bond films and in two Batman films.

Filmography

Films

TV series

References

External links

1928 births
2015 deaths
British male stage actors
British male television actors
British people of Chinese descent
20th-century British male actors
21st-century British male actors